A top-and-tail railway train has locomotives at both ends, for ease of changing direction, especially where the terminal station has no run-round loop. This is a British term. It is normal for only the leading locomotive to power the train when in top-and-tail mode.

It is properly distinct from a push-pull train, which has a locomotive at one end and a control cab at the other end.

Trains going up zig zags of the Khyber Pass are top-and-tailed, although Pakistan Railways calls this by a different term.

In Japan, the term "push-pull" is confusingly used to describe trains top-and-tailed with a locomotive at either end. (True push-pull operation with a locomotive at one end is not seen on Japanese mainline railways.)

Australia 

In New South Wales the XPT is a train with a light weight locomotive at either end. It is based on the British HST.  The locomotive at the front operates at full traction power, while the locomotive at the rear operates at half power, the other half powering lighting and air conditioning, etc.  This power arrangement is needed to cater with steep 1 in 40 (2,5%, or 25‰) and 1 in 33 (3%, or 30‰) gradients.

Occasionally a short XPT train operates with only one engine and fewer carriages, in which case the whole train must be turned on a triangle such as at Dubbo.

Top and tail operation is also used for ballast trains which have to move up and down a line undergoing track maintenance. It is safer to drive these trains from the front when operating in "reverse".

References 

Rail transport operations